Until 1 January 2007, Støvring Municipality was a municipality covering an area of 220 km², and with a total population of 13,057 (2005). Støvring municipality ceased to exist as the result of Kommunalreformen ("The Municipality Reform" of 2007).  It was merged with Nørager and Skørping municipalities to form the new Rebild Municipality.  This created a municipality with an area of 628 km² and a total population of 28,457 (2005).

Mayors of Støvring Municipality

Former municipalities of Denmark
North Jutland Region
1970 establishments in Denmark
2007 disestablishments in Denmark